Thump Records is a record label specialized in various genres of music. Founded by Bill Walker and Al Lopez for $10,000. In 1997 Bill Walker became its sole C.E.O. and President.

History
Thump's success was ignited by the popularity of its Old School and Low Rider compilation series (co-branded with Low Rider Magazine).  Thump's Distributor is major label Universal, and Thump has also signed many artists under its own banner. Tierra gained hit The Intruders' 1967 song "Together", written by Gamble & Huff, which reached #18 on the Billboard Hot 100 from Boardwalk Records, and later Tierra joined Thump Records.

Artists on Thump Records

 Frenchy Valens
 Ronnie Hudson
 3AM
 Zapp Band
 vixen ent
 Nate Dogg
 Bizzy Bone
 Adolfo
 Bad Mouth
 Candy Man
 Daphee (singer) "I Like My Hair Like This"
 Deja Destinee
 DJ Flash
 DJ King Assassin
 Domino
 Don Cisco
 El Chicano
 Hispanic MC's
 Jodi V
 Joe Moses
 Jonny Z
 Jorge G
 J.V.
 Katalina
 KEVINRAY

 Kid Frost
 Lawless
 Beer Run Bobby 
 Pepe Marquez
 Lighter Shade of Brown
 Lil' Cuete
 Lonzo
 MC Magic
 Mr. Capone-E
 Mr. Patron
 Namek
 Paperboy
 Rush Wun
 Rocky Padilla
 ShawnP
 Suave MC & Baby G
 Sugar Style
 Sky Tower Click
 The S.O.G. Crew
 Thoughts
 Tierra
 Tommy Gunn
 World Class Wreckin' Cru

See also 
 List of record labels
 Chicano Rock
 Brown-eyed soul
 Gangsta Rap
 G-Funk
 Santana
 Urban Kings Music Group(Chicano label)

References

External links
 Official site

American record labels
Latin American music record labels
Hip hop record labels